The Last Basselope is a children's book by Berkeley Breathed published in 1992. The 32 page story depicts Breathed's Outland characters, led by Opus the Penguin, hunting the last remaining specimen of a purportedly fierce beast called a Basselope. Once found, the beast—named Rosebud—turns out to be friendly and harmless.

The book has been recommended as a resource with which to teach about the concept of endangered species and extinction.

References

External links
Berkeley Breathed's website

1992 children's books
American children's books
American picture books
Children's fiction books
Bloom County
Books about penguins
Books by Berkeley Breathed
Little, Brown and Company books